The 2017 World Junior Curling Championships (branded as the 2017 VoIP Defender World Junior Curling Championships for sponsorship reasons) was held from February 16 to 26 at the Gangneung Curling Centre in Gangneung, South Korea.

The tournament has been designated as a test event for curling at the 2018 Winter Olympics.

Men

Teams
Men's teams

Round-robin standings
Final round-robin standings

Round-robin results

Draw 1
Thursday, February 16, 14:00

Draw 2
Friday, February 17, 9:00

Draw 3
Friday, February 17, 19:00

Draw 4
Saturday, February 18, 14:00

Draw 5
Sunday, February 19, 9:00

Draw 6
Sunday, February 19, 19:00

Draw 7
Monday, February 20, 14:00

Draw 8
Tuesday, February 21, 9:00

Draw 9
Tuesday, February 21, 19:00

Draw 10
Wednesday, February 22, 14:00

Draw 11
Thursday, February 23, 9:00

Draw 12
Thursday, February 23, 19:00

Tie Breaker
Friday, February 24, 9:00

Playoffs

1 vs. 2
Friday, February 24, 19:00

3 vs. 4
Friday, February 24, 19:00

Semifinal
Saturday, February 25, 9:00

Bronze-medal game
Sunday, February 26, 14:00

Final
Sunday, February 26, 14:00

Top 5 Player percentages
Round robin only

Women

Teams
Women's teams

Round-robin standings
Final round-robin standings

Round-robin results

Draw 1
Thursday, February 16, 9:00

Draw 2
Thursday, February 16, 19:00

Draw 3
Friday, February 17, 14:00

Draw 4
Saturday, February 18, 9:00

Draw 5
Saturday, February 18, 19:00

Draw 6
Sunday, February 19, 14:00

Draw 7
Monday, February 20, 9:00

Draw 8
Monday, February 20, 19:00

Draw 9
Tuesday, February 21, 14:00

Draw 10
Wednesday, February 22, 9:00

Draw 11
Wednesday, February 22, 19:00

Draw 12
Thursday, February 23, 14:00

Playoff Tie Breaker
Friday, February 24, 9:00

Relegation Tie Breaker
Friday, February 24, 9:00

Playoffs

1 vs. 2
Friday, February 24, 14:00

3 vs. 4
Friday, February 24, 14:00

Semifinal
Saturday, February 25, 9:00

Bronze-medal game
Saturday, February 25, 15:00

Final
Saturday, February 25, 15:00

Top 5 Player percentages
Round robin only

References

External links

World Junior Curling Championships
World Junior Curling Championships
World Junior Curling Championships
Sports competitions in Gangneung
World Junior Curling Championships
World Junior Curling Championships
International curling competitions hosted by South Korea
Curling